María Bonita (Pretty Maria) is a 1995 Colombian telenovela hit which starred Adela Noriega,  Fernando Allende, and Julio Cesar Luna.

Story
This story develops in Isla Fuerte, a Caribbean island where Augusto Santos is in his third term as President. The small country lives on tourism and the production of bananas.

One day, María Bonita who is a gorgeous Mexican artist is invited by the President for his 60th birthday. She never imagined that she would be trapped forever in that island, nor that she will meet the love of her life, Jose Santos.

He is the illegitimate son of the president, who hates his father for not recognizing him as a son. Jose Santos promised to take revenge on his father, María will come between them.

Cast 
 Adela Noriega – María Reynoso
 Fernando Allende – Jose Santos Ramand
 Julio Cesar Luna – Augustino Santos Yarzagaray
 Juan Pablo Shuk – Rodrigo Santos
 Flora Martínez – Imelda Santos
 Margalida Castro – Libia Santos de Carvajales
 Bruno Diaz – Calancho
 Adriana Vera – Evita Santos
 Robinson Diaz – Carlos Santos
 Felipe Solano – Jose Rojas – Claudio Carvajales
 Maria Eugenia Davila – La Maga
 Iris Oyola – Adalgiza
 Jorge Romero – Alirio
 Cesar Mora – Jacinto Barba
 Sandra Perez – Lupe
 Jose Saldarriaga – Vicente Reinoso
 Ana Maria Hoyos – Kathy Albarracin
 Carmen Maria Torres – Tona

References

External links
 

1995 telenovelas
1995 Colombian television series debuts
1996 Colombian television series endings
Telemundo telenovelas
Colombian telenovelas
RTI Producciones telenovelas